The Udagamandalam block is a revenue block in the Nilgiris District of Tamil Nadu, India. It has a total of 13 panchayat villages.

References 
 

Revenue blocks of Nilgiris district